David Gosselin (born June 22, 1977) is a Canadian former professional ice hockey left winger who played 13 games in the National Hockey League for the Nashville Predators between 2000 and 2001. The rest of his career, which lasted from 1998 to 2012, was mainly spent in the minor leagues. He was drafted 78th overall by the New Jersey Devils in the 1995 NHL Entry Draft and made his NHL debut for the Predators during the 1999–00 NHL season.

Career statistics

Regular season and playoffs

External links
 

1977 births
Living people
Fehérvár AV19 players
Canadian expatriate ice hockey players in Germany
Canadian ice hockey left wingers
Chicoutimi Saguenéens (QMJHL) players
Frankfurt Lions players
Ice hockey people from Quebec
Kassel Huskies players
Milwaukee Admirals players
Milwaukee Admirals (IHL) players
Nashville Predators players
New Jersey Devils draft picks
People from Lévis, Quebec
SC Bietigheim-Bissingen players
Sherbrooke Faucons players
Thetford Mines Isothermic players